The American Alpine Journal is an annual magazine published by the American Alpine Club. Its mission is "to document and communicate mountain exploration." The headquarters is in Golden, Colorado.

Subtitled as a compilation of "The World's Most Significant Climbs," the magazine contains feature stories about notable new routes and ascents, written by the climbers, as well as a large "Climbs and Expeditions" section containing short notes by climbers about new and noteworthy achievements. Some general articles about mountaineering, mountain medicine, the mountain environment, or other topics are also sometimes included. Each issue includes book reviews, memorials of deceased members, and club activities.

History
The journal was established in 1929. In 1957 and 1958, the editor was Francis P. Farquhar. From 1960 to 1995, the editor was H. Adams Carter, who brought the journal to international pre-eminence. From 1996 to 2001, the editor was Christian Beckwith. Since 2002, the editor has been John Harlin III. The overall format of the journal has changed little since at least the 1970s, but current plans include more complete worldwide coverage (particularly including Europe and New Zealand) and electronic/online access (see below).

Similar journals
Other journals of record for climbing include the Alpine Journal published by the UK Alpine Club, the Canadian Alpine Journal published by the Alpine Club of Canada, the Himalayan Journal, and Iwa To Yuki, a Japanese magazine. All of these magazines are often used by climbers planning expeditions, especially those who wish to verify that a proposed route would be a new one. Entries in these journals (and others) concerning major Himalayan peaks are indexed in the Himalayan Index.

Online access 
In March 2007, the American Alpine Journal inaugurated free, full, searchable online access for its issues dating back to 1966. All earlier issues will eventually be added. A complete index is also available for free download. A complete set of the journal on DVD may eventually be available for purchase.

See also
 National Geographic Adventure
Outside (magazine)

References

External links
 
 Searchable online access
 Himalayan Index

Annual magazines published in the United States
Sports magazines published in the United States
Magazines established in 1929
Magazines published in Colorado
Climbing magazines